Mater Dei (Latin for Mother of God) is a title of Mary. It may refer to:

Educational institutions
 Mater Dei College (disambiguation)
 Mater Dei High School (disambiguation)

Australia
Mater Dei Catholic Primary School, Ashgrove, Queensland
Mater Dei Special School, Camden, New South Wales

United States
Mater Dei School (Bethesda, Maryland)
Mater Dei Seminary, in Omaha, Nebraska; see Mark Pivarunas
Mater Dei Academy, a Catholic K-8 school in Wickliffe, Ohio
Mater Dei Catholic School, Lansdale, Pennsylvania

Other places
Mater Dei School, New Delhi, India
Mater Dei Institute of Education, Dublin, Ireland
Mater Dei Hospital, Malta
Mater Dei School (Thailand), Bangkok, Thailand

Other uses
Mater dei (1950 film), a 1950 Italian drama film directed by Emilio Cordero

Mater Dei Hospital, also known simply as Mater Dei, in Msida, Malta